Abar may refer to:

Abar (album), an album by Bangladeshi rock band Black
Abar, the First Black Superman, a film
Abar (Queen), a Nubian queen dated to the Twenty-fifth Dynasty of Egypt
Abar language

People with the surname
Saber Abar (born 1984), Iranian actor and theater director